Genko Rashkov (17 January 1920 – 1996) was a Bulgarian equestrian. He competed at the 1956 Summer Olympics and the 1960 Summer Olympics.

References

1920 births
1996 deaths
Bulgarian male equestrians
Olympic equestrians of Bulgaria
Equestrians at the 1956 Summer Olympics
Equestrians at the 1960 Summer Olympics
Sportspeople from Plovdiv
20th-century Bulgarian people